Players and pairs who neither have high enough rankings nor receive wild cards may participate in a qualifying tournament held one week before the annual Wimbledon Tennis Championships.

The qualifying rounds for the 1997 Wimbledon Championships were played from 17 to 22 June 1997 at the Bank of England Ground in Roehampton, London, United Kingdom.

Seeds

  Laura Golarsa (qualified)
  Marketa Kochta (second round)
  Janet Lee (first round)
  Nana Miyagi (qualifying competition, lucky loser)
  Park Sung-hee (first round)
  Lenka Cenková (first round)
  Sonya Jeyaseelan (first round)
  Silvija Talaja (qualifying competition)
  Marlene Weingärtner (second round)
  Amélie Mauresmo (qualifying competition)
  Kristine Kunce (second round)
  Siobhan Drake-Brockman (first round)
  Nancy Feber (qualified)
  Jane Chi (first round)
  Angélica Gavaldón (second round)
  Sylvia Plischke (qualifying competition)

Qualifiers

  Laura Golarsa
  Haruka Inoue
  Nancy Feber
  Anne Kremer
  Karen Cross
  Nicole Pratt
  María Vento
  Miriam Schnitzer

Lucky loser
  Nana Miyagi

Qualifying draw

First qualifier

Second qualifier

Third qualifier

Fourth qualifier

Fifth qualifier

Sixth qualifier

Seventh qualifier

Eighth qualifier

External links

1997 Wimbledon Championships on WTAtennis.com
1997 Wimbledon Championships – Women's draws and results at the International Tennis Federation

Women's Singles Qualifying
Wimbledon Championship by year – Women's singles qualifying
Wimbledon Championships